The Arab–Israeli war normally refers to:
 The Israeli–Palestinian conflict, the conflict between Israel and the Palestinian Arabs
 The Arab–Israeli conflict, the conflict between Arab countries and Israel
1948 Palestine War, known as the First Arab–Israeli War
 1948 Arab–Israeli War, also known as the First Arab–Israeli War
Suez Crisis, 1956, known as the Second Arab–Israeli War
Six-Day War, 1967, known as the Third Arab–Israeli War
Yom Kippur War, 1973, known as the Fourth Arab–Israeli War

Arab–Israeli War may also refer to:

Other outbreaks
 1947–1948 civil war in Mandatory Palestine
War of Attrition, a war between Israel and Egypt, the USSR, Jordan, Syria, and the PLO in 1967–1970
1982 Lebanon War, an Israel Defense Forces invasion of southern Lebanon in 1982–1985
2006 Lebanon War, a military conflict in Lebanon, northern Israel and the Golan Heights

Other 

 Arab–Israeli Wars (game), a board game from Avalon Hill

See also
1978 South Lebanon conflict, an invasion of Lebanon up to the Litani River by the Israel Defense Forces
2014 Gaza War, Israeli bombardment, Palestinian rocket attacks, and ground fighting
2021 Israel–Palestine crisis, tensions in Jerusalem led to eleven days of fighting between Israel and Gazan militant groups
First Intifada, a Palestinian uprising against the Israeli occupation of the Palestinian Territories in 1987–1993
Gaza War (2008–2009), an armed conflict between Palestinians in the Gaza Strip and Israel
Israeli–Lebanese conflict
Israeli–Palestinian conflict
List of wars involving Israel
2012 Israeli operation in the Gaza Strip (Operation Pillar of Defense), a 2012 Israel Defense Forces operation
Palestinian insurgency in South Lebanon, a conflict initiated by Palestinian militants based in South Lebanon upon Israel in 1968–1982
Reprisal operations (Israel), military operations carried out by the Israel Defense Forces during the 1950s and 1960s
Second Intifada, a Palestinian uprising against Israeli occupation in 2000–2005
South Lebanon conflict (1985–2000), warfare involving Israel Defense Forces and its Lebanese proxy militias and Lebanese Muslim guerrillas in South Lebanon